Freiherr Hasso Eccard von Manteuffel (14 January 1897 – 24 September 1978) was a German baron born to the Prussian noble von Manteuffel family and was a general during World War II who commanded the 5th Panzer Army. He was a recipient of the Knight's Cross of the Iron Cross with Oak Leaves, Swords and Diamonds of Nazi Germany.

After the war, he was elected to the Bundestag (West German legislature) and was the spokesman for defense of the Free Democratic Party. A proponent of rearmament, he was responsible for coining the new name for the post-World War II German armed forces, the Bundeswehr.

Early career
Hasso von Manteuffel began his military career during the First World War. In 1919, he joined the Freikorps and then the newly created Reichswehr.  In February 1937 he joined the Panzer Troop Command of the OKH, and in February 1939 became a senior professor at Panzer Troop School II in Berlin.

World War II
During Operation Barbarossa, Manteuffel commanded a battalion in the 7th Panzer Division, in the Army Group Centre.

In early 1943, Manteuffel was sent to Africa, where on 5 February he became the commander of the Division von Broich/von Manteuffel, serving in 5th Panzer Army. Here Manteuffel took part in the Battle of Tunisia. Manteuffel assumed command of the 7th Panzer Division on 22 August 1943 and was posted to the Eastern Front, which had by then collapsed following the Battle of Kursk and the resulting Soviet counteroffensive. The division retreated during the resulting Battle of the Dnieper.

Manteuffel was appointed commander of the Grossdeutschland Division on 1 February 1944. The division engaged the Red Army west of Kirovograd, then retreated across Ukraine. In late July Großdeutschland was ordered to East Prussia, following the collapse of Army Group Centre in Soviet Operation Bagration. The division failed to break through to the Army Group North in the Courland Pocket.

On 1 September 1944, Manteuffel was promoted to General of Panzer Troops and given command of the 5th Panzer Army on the Western Front, which took part in the Ardennes Offensive. Manteuffel's 5th Panzer Army achieved the deepest penetration of Allied lines during the offensive, almost reaching the Meuse River, and engaging the U.S. forces at the Battle of Bastogne. On 10 March 1945 Manteuffel was made the commander of the 3rd Panzer Army on the Eastern Front, attached to Army Group Vistula. His army was assigned to defend the banks of the Oder River north of the Seelow Heights. On 25 April the Soviet 2nd Belorussian Front broke through Third Panzer Army's line, forcing a German retreat. On 3 May 1945 Manteuffel surrendered his troops to the British Army at Hagenow, Germany.

Post-war

At first Manteuffel was interned at the British-administered Island Farm Special Camp 11 for high-ranking Wehrmacht officers. In 1946 he was handed over to the Americans and took part in the U.S. Army Historical Division project, for which he produced a monograph on the mobile warfare aspect of the Ardennes Offensive.

After his release in December 1946, he entered politics and was a representative of the Free Democratic Party of Germany (FDP) in the German Bundestag from 1953 to 1957. In 1957 he joined the German Party. In the early 1950s Manteuffel advised on the redevelopment of the Bundeswehr.

Manteuffel was charged in 1959 for having a deserter shot in 1944 (he reversed the court martial's original verdict of imprisonment and  decided for a death sentence, using the Führer Order No.7 as a basis). He was convicted and sentenced to two years in prison. Alaric Searle comments that Manteuffel exceeded his powers as a divisional commander, but at the same time, "Manteuffel's purely military arguments—that signs of disintegration had appeared on other sectors of the front, that the night before the incident a case of desertion had occurred, and that his division's task, in a precarious situation, was to help protect a critical evacuation point—would probably have been accepted in most other Western countries as justifying his action". Searle agrees with Hermann Balck's comment that such a trial would be "unthinkable" for a French or British officer.

He spoke eloquent English; in 1968 he lectured at the United States Military Academy at West Point, speaking about combat in deep snow conditions and worked as a technical adviser on war films. He was interviewed in The World at War episode 19 - "Pincers" (August 1944 – March 1945) in 1973.  Manteuffel died in 1978.

Awards
 Iron Cross (1914): 2nd Class (13 October 1916) & 1st Class (2 May 1917)
 Austrian Military Merit Cross (3rd Class)
 Bavarian Military Merit Cross (3rd Class)
 The Honour Cross of the World War 1914/1918 
 Panzer Badge in Silver 
 War Merit Cross (2nd Class) 2nd Class (22 July 1941) & 1st Class (1 August 1941)
 Knight's Cross of the Iron Cross with Oak Leaves, Swords and Diamonds
 Knight's Cross on 31 December 1941 as Oberst and commander  of Schützen-Regiment 6
 Oak Leaves on 23 November 1943 as Generalmajor and commander of the 7. Panzer-Division
 Swords on 22 February 1944 as Generalleutnant and commander of the 7. Panzer-Division
 Diamonds on 18 February 1945 as General der Panzertruppe and commander-in-chief of 5. Panzerarmee

References

Citations

Bibliography

External links
 

 

1897 births
1978 deaths
Military personnel from Potsdam
People from the Province of Brandenburg
German Party (1947) politicians
German Army personnel of World War I
Prussian Army personnel
Barons of Germany
Members of the Bundestag for North Rhine-Westphalia
Recipients of the clasp to the Iron Cross, 1st class
Recipients of the Military Merit Cross (Bavaria)
Recipients of the Knight's Cross of the Iron Cross with Oak Leaves, Swords and Diamonds
Generals of Panzer Troops
Reichswehr personnel
20th-century Freikorps personnel
Members of the Bundestag for the Free Democratic Party (Germany)
German prisoners of war in World War II held by the United Kingdom